The 1936 United States Senate election in Nebraska was held on November 3, 1936. 

Incumbent Independent U.S. Senator George W. Norris was re-elected to a fifth consecutive term. Norris had left the Republican Party earlier that year over dissatisfaction with serving in the minority.

Republican primary
 Lloyd C. Constable
 Cleon Dech
 Harry O. Palmer, candidate for Governor in 1930
 Robert Simmons, former U.S. Representative from Nebraska's 6th district and candidate for Senate in 1934

Primary Results

Democratic primary

Candidates
 Terry Carpenter, former U.S. Representative from Nebraska's 5th district, Democratic candidate for Governor in 1934
 George Hall
 Emil Placek, candidate for U.S. Representative in 1924
 James Quigley

Results

General election

Candidates
 Terry Carpenter, former U.S. Representative (Democratic)
 George W. Norris, incumbent Senator first elected in 1912 (Independent)
 Robert Simmons, former U.S. Representative (Republican)

Results

See also 
 United States Senate elections, 1936

References 

1936
Nebraska
United States Senate